Harrogate is a town in North Yorkshire, England

Harrogate may also refer to:
in England
 The Borough of Harrogate, a local government district in North Yorkshire
 Harrogate (UK Parliament constituency), a former constituency 
 Harrogate railway station 
 Harrogate Town F.C., a football club 
elsewhere
 Harrogate, Tennessee, United States, a city
 Harrogate, South Australia, a town

See also
 Harrowgate (disambiguation)